The 45th Annual Japan Record Awards took place on December 31, 2003, starting at 6:00PM JST. The primary ceremonies were televised in Japan on TBS.

Award winners 
Japan Record Award:
Max Matsuura (producer), BOUNCEBACK (composer) & Ayumi Hamasaki (songwriter, singer) for "No way to say"
Best Vocalist:
Kiyoshi Hikawa
Best New Artist:
Yo Hitoto

External links
Official Website

Japan Record Awards
Japan Record Awards
Japan Record Awards
Japan Record Awards
2003